Golfe is a Prefecture located in the Maritime Region of Togo. The prefecture's seat is Lomé which is also the administrative capital of the Togolese Republic.

Cantons within Golfe include: Amoutivé, Bè, Baguida, Agoè-Nyivé, Sanguéra, Togblékopé, Aflao-Gakli, Aflao-Sagbado, Légbassito, and Vakpossito

References 

Prefectures of Togo
Maritime Region